Suwandi  (born 21 August 1976) is an Indonesian former professional tennis player.

Suwandi reached his highest individual ranking on the ATP Tour on June 18, 2001, when he became World number 208.  He plays primarily on the Futures circuit and the Challenger circuit.

Suwandi was a member of the Indonesian Davis Cup team, posting a 23–26 record in singles and an 11–3 record in doubles in thirty-three ties played.

Career finals

Tour singles titles – all levels (4–3)

Tour doubles titles – all levels (7–4)

External links
 
 
 

1976 births
Living people
Indonesian male tennis players
Asian Games medalists in tennis
Tennis players at the 2002 Asian Games
Tennis players at the 1994 Asian Games
Asian Games silver medalists for Indonesia
Asian Games bronze medalists for Indonesia
Medalists at the 1994 Asian Games
Medalists at the 2002 Asian Games
Southeast Asian Games gold medalists for Indonesia
Southeast Asian Games silver medalists for Indonesia
Southeast Asian Games bronze medalists for Indonesia
Southeast Asian Games medalists in tennis
Competitors at the 2005 Southeast Asian Games
Competitors at the 2007 Southeast Asian Games
Sportspeople from Bandung
21st-century Indonesian people
20th-century Indonesian people